NGC 528 is a lenticular galaxy located in the constellation Andromeda. It is located an estimated 70 million parsecs from the Milky Way. The object was discovered on 22 August 1865 by the German-Danish astronomer Heinrich Ludwig d'Arrest.

See also
 List of NGC objects (1–1000)

References

External links
 

Lenticular galaxies
0528
00988
Andromeda (constellation)
Discoveries by Heinrich Louis d'Arrest
Astronomical objects discovered in 1865
005290